Pyrophorus noctilucus, common name headlight elater, is a species of click beetle (family Elateridae).

Description
The basic coloration is  dark brown. The antennae are serrate. The pronotum shows a long backward-pointing tooth.

These beetles are among the brightest bioluminescent insects (Levy 1998). With a brightness of around 45 millilamberts (Harvey & Stevens 1928), they are said to be technically bright enough to read by (Meerman).  They achieve their luminescence by means of two light organs at the posterior corners of the prothorax, and a broad area on the underside of the first abdominal segment. Their bioluminescence is similar to that of another group of beetles, the fireflies, although click beetles do not flash, but remain constantly glowing (though they can control the intensity; for example, they become brighter when touched by a potential predator). Also the larvae and the pupae have light organs and the eggs are luminous too.

Adults feed on pollen, fermenting fruit and sometimes small insects, while the larvae live in the soil and feed on various plant materials and invertebrates, as well on the larvae of other beetles.

Distribution
This species can be found in Belize, Saint Vincent and the Grenadines, Argentina, Cayman Islands, Mexico, Panama, Paraguay, Colombia, Venezuela, Trinidad and Tobago, Guyana, Suriname, Brazil, Ecuador, Peru, Bolivia, Texas, Hawaii, Cuba, Puerto Rico, Dominican Republic, Jamaica, Uruguay, and Florida.

References

  Elateridae in SYNOPSIS OF THE DESCRIBED COLEOPTERA OF THE WORLD
 Biolib
 American Insects
 Harvey, E. N. and K. P. Stevens. 1928. The brightness of the light of the West Indian elaterid beetle, pyrophorus. J. Gen. Physiol. 12: 269–272.

Elateridae
Bioluminescent insects
Beetles described in 1758
Taxa named by Carl Linnaeus